Ernest Sadzawka (24 March 1890 – 5 April 1960)  was a Belgian rower. He competed in the men's double sculls event at the 1920 Summer Olympics.

References

External links
 

1890 births
1960 deaths
Belgian male rowers
Olympic rowers of Belgium
Rowers at the 1920 Summer Olympics
Place of birth missing